Margaret Gardiner (born 21 August 1959) is a South African journalist and beauty queen who was the winner of the Miss Universe 1978, the first South African woman to win the Miss Universe title. She was 18 years old when she won the pageant.  After the three semi-final competitions, she entered the five finalists in fourth place, but ended up winning the pageant after answering the final question.

During the event held in Acapulco, she received her crown from Janelle Commissiong, the first black titleholder of the pageant. She was the only Miss Universe titleholder from South Africa until Demi-Leigh Nel-Peters was crowned Miss Universe 2017.

She holds a BA in psychology from the College of Charleston and the author of two books on health and beauty and attended St. George's Cathedral where Desmond Tutu preached. She is now working as a print and television journalist in Los Angeles. She is married to Andre Nel, a professor of Pediatrics and Public Health at UCLA.

References

1959 births
Living people
Miss Universe 1978 contestants
Miss Universe winners
Miss South Africa winners
South African beauty pageant winners
South African emigrants to the United States
White South African people
Writers from Cape Town